Octanal is the organic compound, an aldehyde, with the chemical formula CH3(CH2)6CHO. A colorless fragrant liquid with a fruit-like odor, it occurs naturally in citrus oils.  It is used commercially as a component in perfumes and in flavor production for the food industry. It is usually produced by hydroformylation of heptene and the dehydrogenation of 1-octanol.

Octanal can also be referred to as caprylic aldehyde or C8 aldehyde.

References
Silberberg, 2006, Principles of Chemistry
Octanal

Fatty aldehydes
Alkanals